High to Medium Air Defense (HIMAD) is a group of anti-aircraft weapons and tactics that have to do with defense against high to medium altitude air threats, primarily aircraft and missiles.
HIMAD and its complements, SHORAD (Short Range Air Defense) and THAAD (Terminal High Altitude Area Defense) divide air defense of the battlespace into domes of responsibility based on altitude and defensive weapon ranges.

United States  

The United States Army HIMAD systems include:
 MIM-104 Patriot
 MIM-23 Hawk

Russia 
Russian HIMAD systems include:
 S-300 
 S-400 
 S-500

China 
 HQ-9
 HQ-22

France / Italy 
 SAMP/T

South Korea 
 L-SAM

India  
 Barak-8 (co-developed with Israel) 
 XRSAM

Iran 
 Bavar-373

Israel 
 Barak-8 (co-developed with India)

See also 
 SHORAD - Short Range Air Defence
 THAAD - Terminal High Altitude Area Defense

Anti-aircraft warfare